Michael James Gilmour (born 15 August 1988) is an Irish cricketer. He made his Twenty20 cricket debut for Northern Knights in the 2017 Inter-Provincial Trophy on 26 May 2017.

References

External links
 
 

1988 births
Living people
Irish cricketers
Northern Knights cricketers
Cricketers from Belfast